Divý mak (Wild Poppy) is the debut album by Slovak  vocalist Szidi Tobias released on BMG Ariola in 2001.

Track listing 

 Notes
 All songs performed in Slovak.

Credits and personnel

 Szidi Tobias - lead vocal
 Milan Vyskočáni - music

 Peter Lipovský - lyrics
 Maroš Bančej - lyrics

References

General
 
 
Specific

External links 
 Szidi Tobias > Discography > Pod obojím on SuperMusic.sk

2001 albums
Szidi Tobias albums